Edgardo Giussani (born 4 November 1955) is an Argentine former professional tennis player.

Biography
Nicknamed "Chupete", Giussani featured three times in the mixed doubles main draw of the French Open with her sister Liliana in the early 1980s. Their younger brother Gustavo also played tennis professionally.

His best result in a Grand Prix tournament came in doubles at the 1981 Bordeaux Open, where he reached the quarterfinals partnering with Guillermo Stevens.

Giussani coached David Nalbandian when the latter was a teenager.

References

External links

1955 births
Living people
Argentine male tennis players
Sportspeople from Córdoba Province, Argentina